Salvador "Sal" San Buenaventura Panelo (born September 23, 1946) is a Filipino lawyer who served as President Rodrigo Duterte's Chief Presidential Legal Counsel (2016–2021) and Presidential Spokesperson (2018–2020). He was also the legal adviser during Duterte's 2016 presidential campaign. As a private lawyer, he has handled cases involving politicians and other controversial personalities. He is a former director of the Integrated Bar of the Philippines (IBP).

Panelo ran for senator in the May 2022 election under the PDP-Laban party, but lost. He was later named by fellow senatorial candidate Robin Padilla as his legislative adviser and mentor in the Senate.

Early life and education
Panelo was born in Naga, Camarines Sur to an Ilocano father from Tubao, La Unión and a Bicolano mother from Camarines Sur. He studied elementary school at the Murphy Elementary School and high school at the Roosevelt Memorial High School (AY 1959–1962). He earned his BS in Political Science and BA English degrees at University of Nueva Cáceres. He moved to Manila to go to the University of the Philippines College of Law for his law education. As a student at the University of the Philippines Diliman and a member of the Sigma Rho fraternity, he was involved in student activism during the pre-martial law period. He stayed at the University of the Philippines and completed law school in 1974. He passed the Philippine Bar Examination the same year.

Career

Early works
Panelo first practiced law at United Laboratories where he served as the company's legal counsel from 1977 to 1987. He 
assumed the directorship of the Integrated Bar of the Philippines (IBP) in 1983 and presidency of the IBP Rizal Chapter in 1985. In 1987, he was hired as a radio anchor at DZEC Radyo Agila where he worked for one year. It was also in 1987 when he started his private law practice.

Panelo ran in the 1992 Philippine Senate election; with the top 24 candidates winning the election, Panelo, who was running under the Kilusang Bagong Lipunan, finished 125th.

Private practice
In his 40 years of law practice, he served as the defense lawyer of prominent politicians such as Datu Unsay Mayor Andal Ampatuan Jr. who was implicated in the 2009 Maguindanao massacre, Calauan Mayor Antonio Sanchez who was tried for the 1993 Eileen Sarmenta and Allan Gomez murder, and the family of former President Ferdinand Marcos in relation to recovering their ill-gotten wealth.

Panelo also lawyered for former Commission on Elections Chairman Benjamin Abalos who was embroiled in the 2007 elections scandal, Philip Medel who was convicted in the murder of actress Nida Blanca, and the family of slain racing champion Enzo Pastor. His other clients include celebrities such as Deniece Cornejo in her 2014 rape case against actor Vhong Navarro, and Dennis Roldan who was convicted of kidnapping a Filipino-Chinese boy in 2005.

Duterte cabinet member
Prior to joining the government of Rodrigo Duterte on June 30, 2016, he was his legal counsel and defense lawyer on the charges of hidden wealth by vice presidential candidate Antonio Trillanes during the presidential campaign. He eventually served as the President-elect's transitional spokesperson before being designated as Chief Presidential Legal Counsel. On May 1, 2020, Panelo began hosting a talk show on People's Television Network titled Counterpoint with Secretary Salvador Panelo, produced by the Presidential Broadcast Staff - Radio Television Malacañang (RTVM). Panelo created the program for the purpose of "discussing the issues affecting our country," as well as to "analyze, dissect issues raised by certain critics and others against certain policies of the government".

Panelo ran and lost in the 2022 Senate election, as he did not finish in the top 12 positions.

Personal life
Panelo resides in Marikina. He had a son, Carlo, who died of heart complications from Down syndrome on January 6, 2017, at the age of 27.

Panelo is a member the Rotary Club of Makati Southwest chapter, a member of the Board of Trustees of the San Beda Law Alumni Association, and Secretary General of the Asean Law Association Golfers’ Club.

References

Living people
Advisers to the President of the Philippines
Duterte administration cabinet members
20th-century Filipino lawyers
Filipino radio journalists
Kilusang Bagong Lipunan politicians
People from Naga, Camarines Sur
University of the Philippines Diliman alumni
1946 births
People from Marikina
PDP–Laban politicians
21st-century Filipino lawyers